The Walk Crisis (also called the Valga Crisis or the Valka Crisis, after the Estonian and Latvian names of the town respectively) was an episode in Estonia–Latvia relations over the territorial dispute along the border between the two countries, chiefly about the town of Walk (now Valga, Estonia and Valka, Latvia) and the island of Runö (now Ruhnu, Estonia). The territorial dispute lasted from both countries' independence in 1918 until its settlement in a border agreement in October 1920.

Background

When the Red Army and Latvian hunters captured Riga in January 1919 during the Latvian War of Independence, the Latvian Provisional Government fled to Liepāja. Allied forces were asked to help save the situation. The Prime Minister of Latvia, Kārlis Ulmanis, also sent a request for assistance to the Estonian Provisional Government. Estonia agreed to help if they were to get something out of it. On 18 February 1919 an agreement on relations and joint military activities was signed, which gave the city of Walk and seven border rural municipalities to Estonia until the state border was determined.

By the summer of the same year, the whole of Northern Latvia was liberated by joint force, but in October the situation became critical once again. On 8 October a German-Russian force based in Courland, led by Russian Major General Pavel Bermondt-Avalov, launched an offensive in Riga to overthrow the Latvian government. In response, Latvia asked Estonia for help. Estonian armored trains and paratroopers rushed to Latvia and stopped Bermondt-Avalov's advance.

Estonia and Latvia then started negotiations on a new military agreement on 10 October 1919. The February agreement had previously been cancelled by Latvia as they saw it as an unauthorized agreement. During the negotiations, the question of Walk came up again. The Latvians did not agree with the Estonian proposal, in response to which Laidoner ordered the armored trains to be brought out of Riga.

Walk had historically almost always been dominated by ethnic Estonians, although ethnic Latvians constituted a plurality of registered voters.

Escalation
By the end of 1919, the Latvian Ministry of Foreign Affairs said that their great concessions would not find any return on the part of Estonia. Estonia in turn saw the negotiations as going nowhere. On the Christmas Eve of 1919, General Laidoner of the Estonian Armed Forces ordered Latvia to end the work of their civilian institutions in Walk and elsewhere in the Estonian-occupied territories. Those who did not comply were to be sent across the border. Latvia refused the demands. In January 1920, the military commanders of both countries met, but no agreement was reached. The following meetings between the Estonian and Latvian delegations did not bring a breakthrough either as the Estonian delegation was not interested in dividing up Walk. At the end of February, the Latvian delegation made the last attempt to compromise. They proposed that Walk was to become a free city but that offer was also rejected by the Estonians.

On the evening of 10 March a secret meeting of the Latvian government took place. According to a representative of the Estonian army in Riga, the meeting had featured discussion of war with Estonia, for which Ulmanis was to be ousted from the position of Minister of War and replaced by General Balodis who would have been more supportive of a war. Already on 20 August 1919, the Latvian organizations of Walk sent a complaint to the Latvian Foreign Minister Zigfrīds Meierovics, in which they complained that Estonians were treating Latvians badly. In December, a new complaint was sent to Prime Minister Kārlis Ulmanis. The accusations were serious: Estonians are cutting down forests belonging to Latvians, Estonians are being aggravated against Latvians in an Estonian newspaper published in Walk, and so on.
Laidoner sent Estonian units and armored trains to the Latvian border. The Latvians had also gathered at the border. Latvian officer Aleksandrs Plensners threatened to occupy Walk by military force to which Estonian officer Julius Jürgenson responded with a threat to use the navy to take Riga. On 18 March Balodis said that as long as he was commander-in-chief, the Latvian army would not start any military campaign against Estonia. It was soon agreed that the border dispute over Walk would be settled by a court of arbitration chaired by British Colonel Stephen George Tallents.
By the end of June 1920, it became clear to Tallents that he would not be able to make a mutually satisfactory decision, and he set the boundary at his own discretion by 1 July. The Estonians got most of the city of Walk but lost the municipality of Heinaste (Ainaži), which was mostly inhabited by Estonians, together with a small town and a few other places. The decision to record caused a great stir in both Estonia and Latvia, but it was still accepted. It took another three years before a complementary border agreement was concluded.

Runö question
The island of Runö, which both countries also claimed, was too a matter of dispute. "Latvia is ready to give the island of Ruhnu no less freedoms than Estonia, if not more. This would be a good measure against the intrigues of Estonians and would greatly win our sympathy for Sweden, "the Latvian Embassy in Stockholm told the Riga Foreign Ministry in August 1920.

The response of the Estonians to the aspirations of the Latvians was categorical no, there is no question of Ruhnu. At the beginning of January 1922, Estonian Foreign Minister Ants Piip also spoke with the Swedish Ambassador to Estonia about Runö. The latter expressed the wish that "the island of Ruhnu would not be handed over to Latvia, against which the Swedish government can also protest in the affirmative". Ruhnu remained in Estonia.
 
However, the "occupation" of the island before the Latvians is a unique and exceptional story. In January 1919, the Estonian Provisional Government declared the island of Ruhnu part of Estonia, but rumors soon reached Tallinn that the Latvian Government had done the same. The population of Runö themselves, which consisted of 277 ethnic Swedes and 5 ethnic Estonians, and had lived under Swedish law for centuries, wanted to get under Sweden instead. In May, it was decided to send an expedition to "smear" the people of Runö, which received 15,000 marks to buy seal fat from the people of Runö. Cartridges, rifles, leather, kerosene and foodstuffs were also allowed to be brought to the island of Runö.

On 3 June the expedition reached Runö. Nikolai Blees, head of the Ministry of the Interior's Minorities Committee, won the trust of the locals because he communicated with the islanders in Swedish. With that, Blees had played an important role in the fact that the people of Runö had agreed to remain in Estonia. The transaction by which the expedition bought 644 trees and 25 pounds of seal fat from the people of Runö for 13,140 marks also benefited. The fat was paid for in cash and barter (including 100 liters of alcohol and 150 bottles of wine). The very next day, the Estonian flag was hoisted on the island. However, the government could not do anything with the seal fat, and in the end, it spoiled.
After the end of the border disputes, Estonia and Latvia survived in good neighborliness, although disagreements arose over and over again.

References

Estonian War of Independence
1918 in Estonia
1918 in Latvia
1919 in Estonia
1919 in Latvia
1920 in Estonia
1920 in Latvia
Estonia–Latvia relations